María Auxiliadora Jiménez González, more commonly known as Auxi, is a former Spanish football player. Throughout her career she played in Spain's Superliga Femenina for Atlético Málaga, Levante UD, Estudiantes Huelva and CD Híspalis. She won three leagues with Málaga and Levante, and was the league's top scorer in 2000 and 2006.

Auxi was a member of the Spain women's national football team, and played the 1997 European Championship.

International goals 
Women's Tournament Slovakia
 1 in FR Yugoslavia 1–1 Spain (1996)
1999 FIFA Women's World Cup play-off
 1 in Scotland 0–3 Spain (1998)
 2003 FIFA Women's World Cup qualification
 2 in Spain 6–1 Iceland (2001)
 1 in Spain 2–1 Russia (2002)
2009 Euro qualification
 1 in Belarus 0–3 Spain (2007)

References

External links
 

1975 births
Living people
Spanish women's footballers
Women's association football forwards
Primera División (women) players
Levante UD Femenino players
Málaga CF Femenino players
Spain women's international footballers
People from Ronda
Sportspeople from the Province of Málaga